Anarsia minutella is a moth in the family Gelechiidae. It was described by Turati in 1929. It is found in Libya.

References

minutella
Moths described in 1929
Moths of Africa